Tommaso Equizi (born 11 July 1997) is an Italian football player. He plays for Levico Terme.

Club career
He made his Serie C debut for Fermana on 22 December 2017 in a game against Ravenna.

On 28 June 2018 after his contract with Internazionale was not renewed Equizi signed with Serie D club Levico Terme.

References

External links
 

1997 births
Sportspeople from Vicenza
Living people
Italian footballers
Inter Milan players
Fermana F.C. players
Serie C players
Association football defenders
Footballers from Veneto